, also called BeruBara, is a shōjo manga series by Riyoko Ikeda published by Shueisha in Margaret from 1972 to 1973. It later was adapted into an anime, The Rose of Versailles. The series was published on 21 May 1972, in the Shueisha Margaret magazine's 21st edition.  Publication lasted 82 weeks.  The series garnered much acclaim, and topped sales ranks regularly. The serialization of the manga finished in the autumn of 1973, with the publication of the last installment in the 52nd edition of the magazine.

In 1983, the first two volumes of The Rose of Versailles were translated in English by Frederik L. Schodt for the purpose of teaching English to Japanese speakers and released in North America by the North American branch of Sanyusha.
It has been licensed in French by Kana, in Spanish by Azake Ediciones, German by Carlsen, Italian by d-world, and in Chinese by Tong Li Publishing.

Volume list

Collected editions 
Compilations published after the completion of the original manga were also successful, especially among women. The following compilations were published:

Berusaiyu no Bara Gaiden 
The Berusaiyu no Bara Gaiden series is a collections of short stories written by Riyoko Ikeda. These stories were published in two separate magazines in 1974 (first publication) after the serialization of the manga Berusaiyu no Bara, and 1984-1985 (second publication). The plot revolves around Oscar, André and Rosalie going to visit the first older sister of Oscar, Hortense de la Lorancy.

The first publication of Berusaiyu no Bara Gaiden started weeks after the release of the last chapter of the manga The Rose of Versailles, in 1974. The gaiden was serialized, like the manga, in Margaret magazine. This publication consists of one gaiden, "Kokui no Hakushaku Fujin". "Kokui no Hakushaku Fujin" is situated in 1787, during the incidents of the Black Knight, before André's eye injuring, and is inspired by the legend of the countess Elizabeth Bathory, who tortured and murdered many young women by the end of the 16th century. Further gaiden appeared in Monthly Jam (月刊Jam) published by Chuokoron-sha between June 1984 and April 1985, consisting of four stories. Like the earlier gaiden, it is set prior to the rioting, around the time of the Black Knight. Loulou is the main character, Oscar the co-protagonist, and Marie Antoinette a supporting character.

BeruBara Kids 
BeruBara Kids ベルばらＫｉｄｓ is a chibi-style Rose of Versailles spin-off by Riyoko Ikeda.

References 

The Rose of Versailles
Rose of Versailles, The

ja:ベルサイユのばら